The Right Ginza is one of the two parts of the Ginza Rabba, the longest and the most important holy scripture of Mandaeism. The other part of the Ginza Rabba is the Left Ginza.

Summaries of each book (or tractate), based mostly on Häberl (2007), are provided below. Translated excerpts are from Gelbert (2011), while Mandaic transliterations are derived from Gelbert (2011, 2021).

Book 1
Book 1 contains a history of creation and of Mandaeism.

The book begins with the opening line (also in Chapter 2 of Book 1):
Praised be Thou, my Lord, with a pure heart,
thou Lord of all worlds.

Book 2
Book 2 also contains a history of creation and of Mandaeism. It has a total of four sections, since it also contains three small appended pieces. These books summarize many of the basic teachings of Mandaeism.
Chapter 2.1 is a chronology of the world containing creation stories and the four epochs of the universe. Titled The Book of the Lord of Greatness (sidra ḏ-mara ḏ-rabuta). 165 paragraphs in Gelbert (2011).
Chapter 2.2 is a confession of sins. Titled The Book of the Jordan (sidra ḏ-iardna). 65 paragraphs in Gelbert (2011).
Chapter 2.3 has exhortations from the messenger of light. 65 poetic lines in Gelbert (2011). Opening line:
When I, the envoy of the Life.
Chapter 2.4 contains teachings on marriage. 11 paragraphs in Gelbert (2011). Opening line:
I call you, my plants whom I have planted, and chosen ones whom I have chosen.

Book 3
Book 3, The Book of the Living First Teachings (sidra ḏ-šuta haita qadmaita), is the longest book in the Ginza. It is a reconstructed poem also dealing with creation themes but concentrating more on the origin of evil. Aldihisi (2008) gives an English translation and detailed commentary for Book 3. The full Mandaic title of Book 3 is Raza u-sidra qadmaia ḏ-šuta haita qadmaita ḏ-huat mn laqadmaia ("The Mystery and the First Book of the First Living Doctrine from the Aforetime" (or "the Very Beginning")). 2,700 lines in Gelbert (2011).

The book begins with the opening lines:
When the fruit (was still) in the fruit,
and when the aether (was still) in the aether,
and when the great Mana of magnificence was existing,
from Whom mighty great Manas emerged,
whose radiance is numerous and whose light is great.

Book 4
Book 4 is a small text connected to the story of Hibil Ziwa's descent into the underworld (World of Darkness). Before descending into the underworld, Hibil Ziwa, along with Sheetil and Anush, are baptized by Manda ḏ-Hayyi and Mara ḏ-Rabuta ("The Lord of Greatness"). Some parts of the book are derived from Qolasta prayers 82 and 180–188 (Drower's CP numbering). Titled The Mystery and the Book and the Commentary of the First Doctrine (raza u-sidra u-aprašata ḏ-šuta qadmaita) in Gelbert (2011). 31 paragraphs in Gelbert (2011).

Book 5
Book 5 contains 5 separate prose texts. The first one, which is also the largest, deals with a journey to the Underworld. The Al-Saadi translation treats this as three separate books, leading in book numbering in the Al-Saadi edition diverging from the other editions (Lidzbarski and Gelbert) from this point onward. The 5 sections are:
Chapter 5.1 (Book 5 in the Al-Saadi edition) covers the savior spirit Hibil Ziwa's descent into the underworld. Titled The Book of the Underworld (sidra ḏ-supat). 206 paragraphs in Gelbert (2011).
Chapter 5.2 (6.1 in the Al-Saadi edition), The Destruction of the Idols of the House (or The Overthrow of the Gods of the House; Mandaic: qarqalta ḏ-kulḥ alahuta ḏ-baita, in Gelbert's Ginza), details the destruction of the world's idols by Manda ḏ-Hayyi. The chapter also contains references to parts of the Hebrew Bible, such as Psalm 114 and Isaiah 5. 44 paragraphs in Gelbert (2011).
Chapter 5.3 (6.2 in the Al-Saadi edition) is an account of the masiqta, the journey of the soul to the World of Light as it passes through maṭarta (stations). Titled My Measure in the World is Full (sidra ḏ-kʿlai balma šilman). 31 paragraphs in Gelbert (2011).
Chapter 5.4 (6.3 in the Al-Saadi edition) recounts the story of Manda ḏ-Hayyi's baptism by John the Baptist, and John the Baptist's death and ascension to the World of Light. 42 paragraphs in Gelbert (2011).
Chapter 5.5 (Book 7 in the Al-Saadi edition), The Mystery and the Book of Šilmai, Lord of the House (raza u-sidra ḏ-šilmai marḥ ḏ-baita), is about Šilmai (or Šalmai), an uthra identified in the chapter as the ruler of the material world and a member of Ruha's entourage. 51 paragraphs in Gelbert (2011). See the article on Shilmai for a summary.

The opening lines of the first four chapters in Book 5 are:

Chapter 1:
For the Life kept the word of Manda ḏ-Hiia hidden,
when he revealed a revelation before the Mana and His Likeness and before the Life,
that an evil spirit had appeared from Siniawis, the lower earth of the darkness.

Chapter 2:
The radiance and the Light of the Life have risen,
and Manda ḏ-Hiia has revealed himself.

Chapter 3:
My measure in the world was filled,
and my sum (of years) in the ages is spent.
I went out of the world of darkness,
and the mixing-bowl of death.

Chapter 4:
These are the words of Yuhana the Baptizer,
as he took up the river of living waters,
and baptized with the living baptism,
and mentioned the name of the Life.
Manda ḏ-Hiia went to Yuhana the Baptizer and spoke to him:
"Arise Yuhana, baptize me with thy baptism,
and pronounce over me that name that thou used to pronounce."

Book 6

Book 6 (8 in the Al-Saadi edition), The Book of Dinanukt (sidra ḏ-dinanukt [dananukt]) is about Dinanukt, who is half-man and half-book, and his journey to the World of Light. 48 paragraphs in Gelbert (2011).

The book begins with the opening lines:
Between waters and waters I sit.
I am Dananukt,
the scribe and wise (one),
the book-in-ink of the gods,
the mighty, vainglorious (and) haughty (one),
who has no lord-of-the-house in his house.
And there is no one older in the building of his upper palace and in his lower houses.

Book 7
Book 7 (9 in the Al-Saadi edition) consists of John the Baptist's words. 113 paragraphs in Gelbert (2011).

The book begins with the opening lines:
This is the wisdom and the teachings
which Yahya, son of Zakria, explained, revealed, and told to the true and faithful Naṣoraeans.
He said:
"If thou hast the strength for it, be a chosen righteous,
who is proven in all his works (= rites),
like a king, carrying the crown upon his head.

Book 8
Book 8 (10 in the Al-Saadi edition) deals briefly with creation and evil, and contains Manda ḏ-Hayyi's warnings against Ruha. 15 paragraphs in Gelbert (2011).

Book 9
Book 9 has 2 parts. Part 1 deals with other religions and the nature of the Godhead; a smaller part 2 deals with the Holy Unique One.
Chapter 9.1, The Destruction of the Seven Planets (qarqalta ḏ-šuba kukbia), is a critique of other religions such as Christianity and Islam. It also mentions the Manichaeans, who are called Zandiqia ("Zandiqs", literally 'distorters of Zand') and Mardmania ("followers of Mar Mani"). The tractate also mentions the Zoroastrians, who are called Iazuqaiia ("Yazuqaeans") and are associated with Shamish (an allusion to Mithra). Titled The Overthrow of the Seven (Planets) (qarqalta ḏ-šuba) in Gelbert (2011). 61 paragraphs in Gelbert (2011).
Chapter 9.2 (Book 11 in the Al-Saadi edition) is about the Great Mana creating a young boy ("only-begotten son") from the heavenly Jordan. Titled The Mystery and Book of the Radiance that is Burning in the Mana (raza u-sidra ḏ-ziua ḏ-iaqid bgu mana). 21 paragraphs in Gelbert (2011).

Book 10
Book 10 (12 in the Al-Saadi edition), The Mystery and the Book of the Radiance that Shines Forth from the Pihta (raza u-sidra ḏ-ziua ḏ-iaqid bgu pihta), deals with the sacrament of the bread (pihta) and also continues the creation story. Within the same book, Hibil and Adakas are mentioned in two different versions of the soul's descent into the physical body of Adam. 66 paragraphs in Gelbert (2011).

The book begins with the opening line:
That first Mana came into being therein,
was created therein and dwelt therein.

Book 11
Book 11 (13 in the Al-Saadi edition), The Mystery and the Book of the Great Anush (Enosh) (raza u-sidra ḏ-anuš rba), deals with battles between the forces in the World of Light and World of Darkness led by Ruha. Since the text is difficult to interpret, Lidzbarski had originally hesitated to translate it. 145 paragraphs in Gelbert (2011).

The book begins with the opening lines:
A son of the realm of Light am I;
I am a son of the eternal abode, which is all uthras,
a son of the city that is all good things.

Book 12
Book 12 (14 in the Al-Saadi edition), in seven parts, mixes poetry and prose and provides a basic introduction to Mandaean beliefs. Chapters 2–5 are acrostic hymns, with each stanza ordered according to a letter of the Mandaic alphabet.
Chapter 12.1 (14.1 in the Al-Saadi edition) is an address by Anush (Enosh). 15 paragraphs in Gelbert (2011).
Chapter 12.2 (14.2.1 in the Al-Saadi edition) is an acrostic (alphabetical) hymn, corresponding to Prayer 179 in the Qolasta. This hymn is also at the beginning of the Code Sabéen manuscripts 25 and 15. The poem begins with the opening lines:
Come in goodness, kušṭa,
light which goest to the house of thy friends.
Chapter 12.3 (14.2.2 in the Al-Saadi edition) is an acrostic hymn. The poem begins with the opening lines:
Dazzling is the dwelling in which the gentle ones live,
and my heart has been chosen among the elect ones.
Chapter 12.4 (14.2.3 in the Al-Saadi edition) is an acrostic hymn that is identical to Prayer 214 in the Qolasta. The poem begins with the opening lines:
The pearl came,
which gave light to the dark, hearts.
Chapter 12.5 (14.2.4 in the Al-Saadi edition) is an acrostic hymn. The poem begins with the opening lines:
Naked did the first deceased
depart from the world.
Chapter 12.6 (14.3 in the Al-Saadi edition) is about the World of Darkness, its king Ur, and its inhabitants. 27 paragraphs in Gelbert (2011). The chapter begins with the opening lines:
I summon you, I teach you and I speak to you, you true and faithful men,
you beholders and discerners:
separate yourselves from the worlds of deficiency,
which are full of confusion and error.
Chapter 12.7 (14.4 in the Al-Saadi edition) is about the directions (North, etc.) and the cosmic ocean. 16 paragraphs in Gelbert (2011). The chapter begins with the opening line:
This is the explanation and the revelation which was revealed to the distinguished men,
who have sundered themselves from the Tibil and from the works of the deluders.

Book 13
Book 13 (15 in the Al-Saadi edition), The Prayer of the Tarmidia to the Pious, comprises a short interim conclusion to what seems to be the original version of the Ginza. 38 paragraphs in Gelbert (2011).

The book begins with the opening line:
We priests bear this testimony over the Mandaean people
and over the Mandaean women and over their sons.

Book 14
Book 14 (16 in the Al-Saadi edition), The Book of the Great Nbaṭ, a prose text containing a creation myth, deals with material from Book 3 such as the various emanations. 65 paragraphs in Gelbert (2011).

The book begins with the opening lines:
This is the mystery and the Book of the Great Nbaṭ,
who came up from below and shone forth,
and blossomed and became great.
Uthras sprang up before him.

Book 15
Book 15 (17 in the Al-Saadi edition) is a collection of poems. Numbering differs between editions since Lidbarski's text includes 20 poems, Gelbert's includes 21 (with Gelbert's 15.18-21 corresponding to Lidzbarski's 15.17-20) and Al-Saadi's translation covers only nine.
Chapter 15.1 (17.1 in the Al-Saadi edition): "The Word" (Anush) descends into the material world on behalf of the Great Life to teach the believers.
Chapter 15.2 (17.2 in the Al-Saadi edition): The Great Life sends Hibil Ziwa to Tarwan. There, he teaches the uthras. Hibil Ziwa also visits Yushamin and Ptahil.
Chapter 15.3 (17.3 in the Al-Saadi edition) is about the Living Water's lamentations about the material world. Šilmai and Nidbai, the guardian uthras of the Living Water, console him.
Chapter 15.4 describes the Moon (known as Sin in Mandaic). It is also found in chapter 53 of the Mandaean Book of John, but with minor variations.
Chapter 15.5: The Great Life sends Sam Ziwa (Shem) to be a guardian for the believers in the material world.
Chapter 15.6: Yukabar Kušṭa goes to the material world to teach the believers.
Chapter 15.7 (17.4 in the Al-Saadi edition): The Great Life sends a messenger who is either Manda ḏ-Hayyi or Yawar to the material world to teach the Nasoreans.
Chapter 15.8 (17.5 in the Al-Saadi edition) is about the messenger Yawar.
Chapter 15.9 is about the soul's lamentation upon being sent into a material body.
Chapter 15.10 (17.6 in the Al-Saadi edition) is about the creation of the uthras by the Great Mana.
Chapter 15.11 consists of a story about Anush's battle with Ruha. Jerusalem is built and settled by the Jews. Anush gains many followers in Jerusalem, but they are killed by the Jews. Anush then destroys Jerusalem.
Chapter 15.12: The Great Life sends an uthra to the material world to teach the believers.
Chapter 15.13 (17.7 in the Al-Saadi edition), the "Hymn of Ptahil", is a creation story similar to Book 3.
Chapter 15.14, the "Hymn of the Priests Questioning the Uthra from the Great Life": The Great Life sends an uthra to the material world to teach the believers. Namrus (Ruha) tries to tempt the uthra without success.
Chapter 15.15 consists of Ptahil's lamentation and his threat of starting a war. One of the two niana poems in Book 15 with the refrain "when the chosen pure one went away".
Chapter 15.16 covers Manda ḏ-Hayyi's debate with Yushamin. Afterwards, Manda ḏ-Hayyi sends Hibil Ziwa to visit Ptahil, then Abatur, and then Yushamin, after which Hibil Ziwa finally returns to the heavens. One of the two niana poems in Book 15 with the refrain "when the chosen pure one went away". After this chapter, Gelbert (2011) has another chapter numbered 17 that is not in Lidzbarski's text.
Chapter 15.17 is a poem about the descent of Manda ḏ-Hayyi into the world and his subsequent battle with Ruha and her entourage. The poem also advises against asceticism.
Chapter 15.18 (17.8 in the Al-Saadi edition) is an admonition that is also found in chapter 44 (Lidzbarski p. 170) of the Mandaean Book of John.
Chapter 15.19 (17.9 in the Al-Saadi edition) is a song about the descent of the soul that is also found in chapter 46 (Lidzbarski p. 172) of the Mandaean Book of John.
Chapter 15.20 is a brief creation story.

Since Mandaean priestly commentary texts often refer to hymns and prayers by their opening lines, the opening lines of each of the 21 poems (since the Gelbert Ginza has 21, rather than 20 poems) in Book 15 are provided below. The English translations below are from Gelbert (2011), while the Mandaic transliterations are derived from Gelbert (2011, 2021).

I am a word, a son of words
I am a peaceful Gupna (grapevine), I who was planted out
At the beginning of the formation of the living waters
When the gleaming was planted from its place
The call it is of the pure Sam-Ziwa, whom the Great (Life) called into being from out of His mouth.
I am Yokabar-Kušṭa, I who went away from the house of my father and came (here).
From the dwelling of the Mighty (Life) the Great (Life) called me, and gave me orders and confirmed me.
With the power of radiance and of the sindirka, they created the yawar and appointed him over everything.
I am the perfume of the uthras, I who went away and found a dwelling in the true hearts.
I am speaking with My Likeness: "Come, I and Thou will form (create)."
When I, Anuš-ʿuthra, came into this world
At the head of the pure wreath, which the Great (Life) sent, He created a calm uthra.
When I, Ptahil, was formed and came into being, I came into being from the exalted well-spring of radiance.
The priests question the man who has come from the Great (Life).
When the chosen pure one went away, the Life created me from Himself.
When the chosen pure one went away, the Life created me from the heights.
When the chosen pure one went into the pure place, where the perfect ones dwell (not in Lidzbarki's text)
I was planted and came up into this world. (= 15.17 in Lidzbarski)
The majestic voice of the Life is calling, The majestic voice of the Mighty Life. (= 15.18 in Lidzbarski)
From the realm of Light have I come, out of thee, eternal abode. (= 15.19 in Lidzbarski)
Who is it who comes, and who is it who speaks to me? (= 15.20 in Lidzbarski)

Book 16
Book 16 contains 10 or 11 mostly shorter poems, depending on the manuscript version, of which Al-Saadi's translation covers four. Many are comparatively simple and straightforward.
Chapter 16.1 is similar to Chapter 15.2, in which Manda ḏ-Hayyi visits the world of Yushamin, the Second Life.
Chapter 16.2 consists of an uthra's admonitions for Adam. The first part of this chapter is also found in the Mandaean Book of John.
Chapter 16.3 consists of Manda ḏ-Hayyi's admonitions for his friends.
Chapter 16.4 contains the messenger of light's announcement to the faithful.
Chapter 16.5 (18.1 in the Al-Saadi edition) is about the masiqta (ascent of the soul to the World of Light) with the help of gifts from Truth (Kušṭa).
Chapter 16.6 teaches that only pious works, not earthy possessions, leads to grace.
Chapter 16.7 (18.2 in the Al-Saadi edition) is an uthra's lamentation about the soul's imprisonment in the material body.
Chapter 16.8 is about the wicked's unsuccessful attempt to trick the descended savior into becoming disloyal.
Chapter 16.9 (18.3 in the Al-Saadi edition) is a prayer to Kushta (Truth) for help in Tibil and during the masiqta. It is also identical to chapter 48 (Lidzbarski p. 178) of the Mandaean Book of John.
Chapter 16.10 is about the Great Life granting prayers for help to survive in Tibil and during the masiqta.
Chapter 16.11 (18.4 in the Al-Saadi edition) consists of Manda ḏ-Hayyi's warnings to his chosen people, who do not want listen to it. It not present in the Parisian manuscripts, the Mhatam Yuhana manuscript, and Petermann's version, but is included in the Leiden codex and Mubaraki version (see Ginza Rabba#Manuscript versions).

The opening lines of each of the 11 poems in Book 16 are provided below. The English translations below are from Gelbert (2011), while the Mandaic transliterations are derived from Gelbert (2011, 2021).

I am the guardian of the pure Tarwan, the son of the great Nbaṭ am I.
An uthra calls from outside, and instructs Adam, the first man.
From the realm of Light I went forth, out of thee, thou eternal abode.
From the day on which I grew fond of the Life, and from the day on which my heart has loved the kušṭa ... I no longer have confidence in the world.
The chosen one is preaching from the other world and instructs the sons of Adam.
At the door of the house of the Life, the uthra() worshipped and sat down and taught.
Who, whose son is this, he who is so fair by nature?
Kušṭa, I testify to thee, as a man who is seeking discernment.
Of all the voices which I have heard, thy voice answered me, thou son of the Mighty (Life).
It is the call of Manda ḏ-Hiia, who is standing on the borders of the world.

Book 17
Book 17 contains 2 poems. The Al-Saadi translation does not cover this book.
Chapter 17.1 is about the Great Mana (Mana Rabba Kabira) and his teachings. It also describes the Great First Mana and the Great Occult Eggs that existed before Mar ḏ-Rabuta (The Great Lord) came into being. The chapter begins with the opening line:
Yonder, yonder I am standing here.
Chapter 17.2 contains a poem with wisdom instructions from a "being" of the Great Life. It also elaborates on how the seven planets and the twelve constellations of Ruha oppress the nišmata (souls). The chapter begins with the opening line:
The Being of Life came,
and erected for us the lamp of the Life.

Book 18
Book 18 contains a chronology of the world plus an apocalypse. It gives a duration of 480,000 years to the world. Abraham, Noah, and Jesus are mentioned in the book. It also contains lists of Pishdadian, Kayanian, Parthian, and Sasanian kings and mentions the Arab conquest of Persia. (The Al-Saadi edition includes only the deluge account, which it numbers 19.) 123 paragraphs in Gelbert (2011).

Colophons
There are 7 colophons in the Ginza Rabba, including 6 in the Right Ginza. There are colophons after books 13 (for books 1–13), 14, 15, 16, 17, and 18, suggesting that these had all originally been separate books before they were compiled into a single codex. Some colophons are also followed by tarik (postscripts).

Qolasta parallels

A few marriage hymns (hadaiata) in Drower's 1959 Canonical Prayerbook of the Mandaeans (CP) correspond to some hymns in Book 12 of the Right Ginza (GR 12):

CP 179 = GR 12.2
CP 214 = GR 12.4

See also

Ginza Rabba
Left Ginza

References

Mandaean texts
Mythology books